The Ichneutinae are a subfamily of braconid parasitoid wasps.

Description and distribution 
Ichneutines are small to medium-sized, non-cyclostome braconids. They lack an occipital carina (ridge on the back of the head).

They have a cosmopolitan distribution.

Biology 
Ichneutines are all solitary, koinobionont parasitoids which oviposit into host eggs, but complete development once the host has become a larva. Members of the tribes Ichneutini and Proteropini attack sawfly larvae, especially in the families Argidae and Tenthredinidae. Members of Muesebeckiini target Lepidopteran leaf-miners.

References

External links 
 Photos on BugGuide

Apocrita subfamilies
Braconidae